Luke Mossey is a British motorcycle rider competing in the 2021 British Superstock 1000 Championship aboard a Kawasaki ZX-10RR. Mossey has competed in a number of different classes during his career, including a wildcard ride in a 250 cc grand
prix.

In June 2021 Mossey was selected as a replacement rider for Team Pedercini competing at the British round of World Superbikes at Donington Park.

Career statistics
Correct as of 25 June 2012

All time

1. – Total includes all British Supersport Championship rides, riding in the Supersport Cup class doesn't count as a separate ride.

By season

Races by year

British 125cc Championship

British Superstock 600 Championship

British Supersport Championship

* Denotes season still in progress

Notes

1. – Mossey competed in the British 125cc ACU academy Cup.
2. – Mossey competed in the British Supersport Privateers Championship (Supersport Cup).

British Superbike Championship

By year

References

External links
 Profile on motogp.com

1992 births
Living people
English motorcycle racers
250cc World Championship riders
Supersport World Championship riders
Superbike World Championship riders